Monolith (formerly, Aqueduct) is an unincorporated community in the Tehachapi Valley, in Kern County, California.

History
The Aqueduct post office opened in 1908, and changed its name to Monolith in 1910.

Aqueduct−Monolith began as a camp for workers at a cement plant for the Owens Valley aqueduct project, supplying materials for the construction of concrete structures. William Mulholland bestowed the name change, due to a huge limestone deposit.  At Monolith Substation in 2014, Southern California Edison commissioned the Tehachapi Energy Storage Project, which was the largest lithium-ion battery system operating in North America at the time of commissioning and one of the largest in the world.

References

Unincorporated communities in Kern County, California
Populated places in the Sierra Nevada (United States)
Tehachapi, California
Unincorporated communities in California